Rostam Khan or Rostom-Khan Saakadze (c. 1588 – 1 March 1643) was a high-ranking Safavid military commander and official of Georgian origin. He held the position of commander-in-chief (sepahsalar) under the Safavid shahs, Abbas I and Safi. In 1643, he was accused of treason and executed under king Abbas II. He features in the contemporary Persian and Georgian chronicles and is also a subject of the 17th-century Persian biography written by a certain Bijan for Rostam Khan's grandson, his namesake and a high-ranking officer in Iran.

Career
Rostam Khan was a son of the Georgian nobleman Bijan Beg (Bezhan), of the Saakadze family, who attended the Georgian prince Bagrat Khan of Kartli in his exile to the Safavid court after the Ottoman invasion of the Georgian lands in 1578. He had two younger brothers named Aliqoli and Isa. Rostam Khan was brought up Muslim and entered the court service under king Abbas I at the age of 11 in 1599. Having distinguished himself in the campaigns against the Ottoman armies and rising through the ranks, he became yasavol-e sohbat (personal attendant or senior squire) to the shah in 1603–4, sardar (general) in 1623–4, Divan-beigi (chancellor) in 1626–7, tofangchi-aghasi (commander of the musketeer corps) in 1630, sepahsalar (commander-in-chief) in 1631, and beglarbegi (governor) of Azerbaijan in 1635. Among his achievements of this period was the recapture of the holy Shia site of Najaf in Iraq during the war against the Ottomans in 1631.

Involvement in Georgia and last years
At the head of an Iranian army, Rostam Khan helped a fellow Muslim Georgian in the Safavid service and a younger brother of his father's suzerain Bagrat Khan, Khosrow Mirza, secure the throne of Kartli, which Khosrow Mirza officially acceded to under the name of Rostam on 18 February 1633. However, Rostam Khan Saakadze's excesses in dealing with the Georgian opposition, especially his devastating raid into the Tsitsishvili family estates, occasioned the split between the two. The contemporary Georgian accounts attribute Rostam Khan's relentlessness to his painful childhood memories associated with the persecution of his family. 
     
Recalled from Kartli by the Iranian government, Rostam Khan Saakadze was commander in Khorasan at the accession of king Abbas II in 1642. In early 1643, he was based in Mashhad to organize an effort to retake Qandahar from the Mughal Empire. The new king's vizier Saru Taqi considered him a personal rival and secured a decree to put him to death for having refused to obey an order from the capital. Rostam was executed in Mashhad, while his brother, the divan-begi Aliqoli, was dismissed from his post.

Nevertheless, even after Rostam Khan's downfall, his offspring continued to hold prominent positions in the Safavid Empire. His son Safiqoli (d. 1679) served as a governor and divanbegi, whereas his other son Bijan, namesake to Rostam Khan's father, served as governor (beglarbeg) of the Azerbaijan province.

References

Sources
 
 
 
 
 
 
 
 
 

1580s births
1643 deaths
People executed by Safavid Iran
Iranian people of Georgian descent
Executed Iranian people
Shia Muslims from Georgia (country)
Executed people from Georgia (country)
Safavid governors of Azerbaijan
Tofangchi-aghasi
Commanders-in-chief of Safavid Iran
Ghilman
16th-century people of Safavid Iran
17th-century people of Safavid Iran
Divan-beigi
Safavid slaves
Safavid ghilman